Rąbino  is a village in Świdwin County, West Pomeranian Voivodeship, in north-western Poland. It is the seat of the gmina (administrative district) called Gmina Rąbino.

For the history of the region, see History of Pomerania.

The village has a population of 1,100.

References

Villages in Świdwin County